Pseudoeurycea mixteca is a species of salamander in the family Plethodontidae.
It is endemic to Mexico.

Its natural habitat is subtropical or tropical dry forests.

References

Amphibians of Mexico
Pseudoeurycea
Taxonomy articles created by Polbot
Amphibians described in 2005